Eric Kostiuk Williams (born 1990) is a cartoonist and illustrator based in Toronto, Ontario, Canada. He has been nominated twice for the Doug Wright Spotlight Award: in 2013 for Hungry Bottom Comics, and in 2018 for Condo Heartbreak Disco, which was also nominated for a Lambda Literary Award. In 2017, Williams was nominated for an Eisner Award in Best Single Issue/One-Shot category for Babybel Wax Bodysuit. He is the recipient of the 2018 Queer Press Grant for his graphic novella Our Wretched Town Hall.

Bibliography
 Hungry Bottom Comics (2012), self-published
 Hungry Bottom Comics: 2 Fags 2 Furious (2013), self-published
 Hungry Bottom Comics 3 (2014), self-published
 The Collected Hungry Bottom Comics (2014), Colour Code
 Babybel Wax Bodysuit (2016), Retrofit Comics/Big Planet Comics 
 Condo Heartbreak Disco (2017), Koyama Press, 
 Ley Lines: How Does It Feel In My Arms? (2017), Czap Books/Grindstone Comics
 Our Wretched Town Hall (2018), Retrofit Comics/Big Planet Comics,

References

1990 births
Living people
Canadian gay artists
Canadian gay writers
LGBT comics creators
21st-century Canadian novelists
21st-century Canadian male writers
21st-century Canadian artists
Canadian male novelists
Canadian graphic novelists
21st-century Canadian LGBT people